Nicholas McKay, Sr. (December 8, 1920 – November 15, 2014) was an American inventor and entrepreneur. His most well-known (and first commercial) product was the Lint Pic-Up, the world's first lint roller.

McKay had the idea after needing masking tape, a paper roll and some wire to clean his suit before chaperoning his son's high school dance in 1956. He and his late wife Helen formed Helmac the next day. Helmac is a household products company that eventually held 92% of the American market in 1996.

McKay credits his humble upbringing on a family farm in Ohio during the Great Depression as inspiration of sorts for his career. He produced When The World Breaks, a documentary on parallels between the Great Depression and today's poor economic climate.

References

Further reading

1920 births
American inventors
2014 deaths